Johann Wolf Joannes Wolfius (10 August 1537 in Bergzabern – 23 May 1600 in Mundelsheim) was a German jurist who corresponded with Lelio Sozzini on the sacrament 1555. He was also a diplomat, translator, historian and theologian. 

He married in 1572 Maria Magdalena Achtsynit, she died in 1581. The next year he married Christina von Bühel, she died in 1591. In 1592 he married the widow Barbara Schaiblin. 

From these wives he had five daughters and two sons.

Works
Lectiones memorabiles et reconditae 1600.
Artis historicae penus : octodecim scriptorum tam veterum quam recentiorum monumentis. Basileae : Ex officina Petri Pernae, 1579.

References

Further reading
 Sabine Schmolinsky, "Im Angesicht der Endzeit? Positionen in den Lectiones memorabiles des Johannes Wolff (1600)," in Hg. Brandes, Wolfram / Schmieder, Felicitas, Endzeiten. Eschatologie in den monotheistischen Weltreligionen (Berlin, de Gruyter, 2008) (Millennium-Studien / Millennium Studies / Studien zu Kultur und Geschichte des ersten Jahrtausends n. Chr. / Studies in the Culture and History of the First Millennium C.E., 16), 369–418.

Jurists from Rhineland-Palatinate
1537 births
1600 deaths